Chuna may refer to:

Chuna (river), a tributary of the Taseyeva in Irkutsk Oblast and Krasnoyarsk Krai, Russia
chuna or choona, an Indian term for calcium hydroxide as used in a digestive aid
Chuna, a medical practice in Korean traditional medicine, known in Chinese as Tui na

See also
 Chunar